This article contains a list of fossil-bearing stratigraphic units in the state of Indiana, U.S.

Sites

See also

 Paleontology in Indiana

References
 

Indiana
Paleontology in Indiana
Stratigraphy of Indiana
Indiana geography-related lists
United States geology-related lists